The Jaitawats are a subgroup of the Rathore Rajputs of India.

They are descendants of Rao Jaita Rathore, who fought historic Battle of Sammel.

References 

Rajput clans